Holler Loudly is a children's picture book written by Cynthia Leitich Smith, illustrated by Barry Gott, and published November 11, 2010 by Dutton Juvenile.

Reception 
Holler Loudly received a positive review from The Bulletin of the Center for Children's Books. The book also received the following accolades:

 Texas Book Festival featured title (2010)
 Dolly Parton's Imagination Library selection
 Writers’ League of Texas Children's Book Award finalist

References 

2010 children's books